Remembrance is a novel written by author Meg Cabot and was published by William Morrow and Company in 2016. It is an adult sequel to her popular Mediator series.

Plot summary
Six years after the events of Twilight, Suze Simon is studying for a master's degree in counselling and interning at the Mission Academy office. She is now engaged to Jesse, who is finishing his medical residency, but he insists on waiting for marriage, much to her frustration. When Suze receives an email from Paul Slater informing her that his company is knocking down her family's old house in Carmel, she calls him, still furious at him for hitting on her at their graduation party. Paul mocks her celibacy, and reminds her that tearing down the house might unleash a curse on Jesse from the Egyptian Book of the Dead, as it is his resting place. He offers to save the house if Suze sleeps with him.

When Suze carelessly tends to a self-harming student named Becca Walters, she is confronted by Lucia, an angry young ghost claiming to protect Becca, who unleashes an earthquake in the office. At the Coffee Clutch that afternoon, Aunt Pru warns Suze to keep an eye on 'the child'. When Lucia attempts to drown Suze, Jesse orders her and Gina to move to Jake's house for their safety; Suze agrees to the date with Paul.

Speaking to Father D the next morning, Suze discovers that Lucia was a classmate of Becca's who died in a horseback riding accident several years ago. Father D approaches the Walters, but is seriously injured in an accident caused by Lucia; at the hospital, Suze and Jesse discover that her triplet step-nieces are mediators - and that Lucia has been playing with them. Lucia then strangely directs Suze to discover that Paul, not her step-brother Brad, is the triplets' real father.

At school the next day, Suze interrogates Becca, who admits that Lucia was murdered by Jimmy Delgado, a handyman at their previous school, who had molested her; she also reports narrowly avoiding abuse by Father Francisco, the school principal. Suze and Jesse track down Jimmy, and she confronts him with Paul while on their date; he shoots himself, but Suze finds his child abuse files and client list, which includes Father Francisco. They are intercepted by Jesse at dinner, and Paul reveals their deal, causing him to walk out. With her knowledge of the triplets' parentage, Suze blackmails Paul into giving her the house. Outside, she finds Jesse, who is hurt at all the secrets Suze has kept from him, but forgives her. As they are about to make up, Paul comes out to mock them once more; Jesse punches him and is arrested for assault.

That night, Suze sees Lucia, who thanks her and moves on to her afterlife. She gives Delgado's files to CeeCee and visits a greatly-improved Becca the next day; when she leaves the Walters' mansion, she finds Jesse with the keys to the house. They drive there, and make love for the first time in Suze's old bedroom, after which Jesse reveals he has received a grant allowing him to start his own medical practice. With the help of Father D, Suze and Jesse get married the next weekend and host a wedding reception at the house, surrounded by their friends and family.

Characters 
 Susannah 'Suze' Simon: the titular mediator, Suze completed a psychology degree after graduation and is now studying for a certification in school counselling, while working as an unpaid intern at the Mission Academy school office.
 Hector 'Jesse' de Silva: a former ghost and Suze's fiancé, now a doctor-in-training hoping to start his own practice in Carmel after completing his medical residency.
 Paul Slater: a fellow mediator and old classmate of Suze's who is strongly attracted to her. He becomes the CEO of Slater Industries after his grandfather's death, and is now 'one of the wealthiest bachelors in LA'. Paul is later revealed to be the father of Brad and Debbie's triplets
 Jack Slater: Paul's younger brother and Suze's old babysitting charge, another mediator who is now a video game designer in Seattle.
 CeeCee Webb: Suze's best friend from the Mission Academy, now a low-level reporter at the Carmel Pine Cone.
 Adam MacTavish: Suze's other best friend from the Academy and CeeCee's on-and-off boyfriend, now studying law at Michigan State.
 Gina Torres: Suze's best friend from New York, who now lives with her and works as a barista at the Coffee Clutch while trying to break into Hollywood.
 Kelly Walters (née Prescott): Suze's high school enemy, who dated Paul before marrying Lance Walters, a rich businessman twice her age.
 Helen and Andy Ackerman: Suze's mother and stepfather, who move to Los Angeles after Andy's home improvement show becomes an international hit.
 Jake 'Sleepy' Ackerman: Suze's eldest stepbrother, a medical marijuana entrepreneur who lives with Jesse.
 Brad 'Dopey' Ackerman: Suze's middle stepbrother, who married Debbie Mancuso after getting her pregnant on graduation night and is now a father to triplets, working at his father-in-law's car dealership.
 David 'Doc' Ackerman: Suze's youngest stepbrother, now a junior at Harvard University.

References

External links

- Meg Cabot's Official Website

2016 American novels
Novels by Meg Cabot
Paranormal romance novels
William Morrow and Company books